TOS-1 Buratino (Heavy Flamethrower System) is a Soviet 220 mm 30-barrel (original system, Object 634 or TOS-1M) or 24-barrel (Object 634B or TOS-1A Solntsepyok) multiple rocket launcher capable of using thermobaric warheads, mounted on a T-72 tank chassis. TOS-1 was designed to attack enemy fortified positions and lightly armoured vehicles and transports, in open terrain in particular. First combat tests took place in 1988 and 1989 in the Panjshir Valley during the Soviet–Afghan War. The TOS-1 was shown for the first time in public in 1999 in Omsk.

TOS-1 is not assigned to the artillery units of the Russian Armed Forces but is found in Russian NBC Protection Troops.

Development

The idea of a heavy short-range MLRS to launch rockets equipped with incendiary and thermobaric warheads arose in the late 1970s. The combat system consisting of the combat vehicle, rockets, and loading vehicle was developed in early 1980s at KBTM in Omsk and was named TOS-1, remaining a secret development for a long time.

The TOS-1 Buratino is intended to engage military personnel, equipment, and buildings, including fortified constructions. The nickname "Buratino" originates with the name of the hero of a Russian retelling of the Pinocchio tale (by Alexey Tolstoy), given the perception of the big "nose" of the launcher (in the original Italian text of Pinocchio, the protagonist is a "burattino", the Italian word for "puppet"). The combat vehicle acts within the combat order of infantry and tanks.The large mass of the launcher, combined with the short range of rockets launches, forced an increase in the level of armor and use the chassis of the T-72 main battle tank. The TZM reloading vehicle was built on the chassis of a KrAZ-255B cross-country truck and equipped with a crane for loading/unloading of the launcher. Production of KrAZ-255B has officially stopped in 1994. Therefore, TZM-T for later Soltsepyok was created based on the chassis of a T-72 variation T-72A.

In 2018, Russian NBC Protection Troops received 30 TOS-1A Solntsepyok (Sunburn) 220 mm multiple rocket launchers.

In October 2017 Saudi Arabian Military Industries signed a Memorandum of Understanding with Rosoboronexport for the local production of the TOS-1A.

Combat history

TOS-1s were first used in combat in Afghanistan's Panjshir valley by the Soviet Union during the Soviet–Afghan War. Later, they were used during the Second Chechen War.

TOS-1As were first used in combat in Iraq by the Iraqi Army in the recapture of Jurf Al Sakhar on October 24, 2014, from ISIL forces. The Iraqi Army launched at least three TOS-1 rockets on 18 June 2017 during the first day of an offensive to recapture the Old City of Mosul, Iraq, from the Islamic State, targeting school buildings held by Islamic State forces and known to be devoid of civilians.

The OSCE reported in September 2015 that the TOS-1 was sighted in a rebel training area in eastern Ukraine.

The TOS-1 was used in Syria on October 10, 2015, by Syrian Army forces against rebel forces in Hama.
In 2016, it was used against rebel forces in the Latakia mountains, with at least one being destroyed by a rebel Kornet ATGM near Northern Aleppo. It was used again by the Syrian Arab Army in April 2017 in the area of Palmyra, and later in the same month to destroy an ISIS camp. In November 2018, the system was deployed by the SAA against ISIS in Al-Safa region.

Azerbaijan used the TOS-1A against the Nagorno-Karabakh Defense Army on 4 April 2016 and 28 September 2020.

It took part in the large-scale Russian-Belarusian exercise Zapad in September 2021.

TOS-1A units were being deployed during the 2022 Russian invasion of Ukraine. Several sightings of the system were reported during the invasion. A verified image of a TOS-1A claimed to have been captured by the Ukrainian Army has been widely shared across social media. On 9 March 2022, the UK Ministry of Defence said on Twitter that the Russian Ministry of Defence had confirmed the use of the weapon system in the Russian invasion of Ukraine. Ukrainian forces went on to capture several units which were left abandoned by the Russians, and have used a captured unit against the Russians.

The TOS-1A was reportedly used by Russian forces during the Battle of Pisky in 2022 One was destroyed by Ukrainian forces in February 2023 during the Battle of Vuhledar.

System description
The TOS-1A Solntsepyok (Blazing Sun) system consists of the following items:
 The "combat vehicle" BM-1 (Object 634B) based on a modified T-72A chassis and fitted with a rotating launch system for 24 unguided thermobaric rockets. All rockets can be launched within 6 to 12 seconds. The launch vehicle is equipped with a fire control system with a ballistic computer, aiming sight and 1D14 laser range finder. The other standard equipment consists of a TKN-3A sight for the commander, a GPK-59 navigation system, an R-163-50U radio station, an R-174 intercom and a 902G smoke grenade launcher with four barrels. The 3-man crew is armed with one AKS-74, one RPKS-74, three RPG-26s, and 10 F-1 hand grenades. The BM-1 is fitted with the same equipment as the T-72 tank (NBC protection, fire-fighting, observation etc.).

 Two TZM-T (Object 563) re-supply vehicles, fitted with a 10 kN crane. The TZM-T has a crew of three, armed with two AKS-74s, one RPKS-74, five RPG-26s, and 10 F-1 hand grenades.
The original rocket for the TOS-1A had a range of only . Modernized systems with active protection, new engine and launchers and other improvements were delivered in early 2018.
The system was modernized in 2016.
 The M0.1.01.04M2 rocket was upgraded in March 2020 to a heavier thermobaric warhead and better 10 km range, to operate outside the range of modern ATGMs.

Operators

Current operators
  – 52
  – 36
  – 12
  – 3
  – ~45 + TOS-1A and a number of TOS-2. New batches of TOS-1A were delivered in September and November 2022.
 : Used by the Royal Saudi Land Forces. A license to produce TOS-1A was granted to Saudi Arabia in 2017.
  – 8+
 
  – at least four TOS-1As and four TZM-Ts captured during the 2022 Russian invasion of Ukraine. One was reportedly used in combat against Russian forces in early April 2022.

Former operators
  – Passed on to Russia.

Gallery

References

External links

 Video of the TOS-1 in action 
 GlobalSecurity profile
 FAS profile
 TOS-1A article on Military Today
 TOS-1 article on Military Today
 Detailed article on Rbase 
 V. Kuzmin's photo blog about the 2010 Victory Parade in Moscow 
 Russia's TOS-1: Moscow's Most Powerful Weapon of War (That Isn't Nuclear) - National Interest

Self-propelled artillery of the Soviet Union
Modern thermobaric weapons of Russia
Multiple rocket launchers
Self-propelled artillery of Russia
Omsktransmash products
Military vehicles introduced in the 1980s
Multiple rocket launchers of the Soviet Union
Tracked self-propelled rocket launchers